Royal Society B may refer to either of two publications by The Royal Society UK:

 Philosophical Transactions of the Royal Society B
 Proceedings of the Royal Society B: Biological Sciences